Shoemaker III Village Site is an archaeological site near Emmitsburg, in the extreme northern section of Frederick County, Maryland. Pottery fragments, projectile points, and other artifacts found at the site date it to 900–1300.

It was listed on the National Register of Historic Places in 1975.

References

External links
, including photo in 1976, at Maryland Historical Trust

Archaeological sites in Frederick County, Maryland
Archaeological sites on the National Register of Historic Places in Maryland
Emmitsburg, Maryland
Native American history of Maryland
Woodland period
National Register of Historic Places in Frederick County, Maryland